Mount Sion is a Gaelic Athletic Association club located in Waterford City, County Waterford, Ireland. It was founded by teachers in the school of the same name. Although technically separate from the school, the club still maintains a close relationship with the school, sharing the same sports facilities in the city.

The club fields teams in both the Waterford Hurling and Gaelic football championships and has had many famous players, including John Keane, Philly Grimes, Tony Browne and Ken McGrath.

The club is mainly concerned with the game of hurling and is the most successful in Waterford with 35 county title wins, although they did win 5 county football titles back in the 1950s. They have also won 2 Munster Senior Hurling titles, in 1981 with victory over Limerick club South Liberties (3-9 to 1-4) and in 2002 beating Sixmilebridge of Clare (0-12 to 0-10). The club has produced a number of All Star winning players for Waterford and also two Inter-county hurlers of the year, Tony Browne in 1998 and Austin Gleeson in 2016. John Keane was also selected on the hurling team of the millennium. Frankie Walsh was the last Waterford man to lift the Liam McCarthy cup in 1959. 

Mount Sion won titles in 1994, 1998, 2000, 2002, 2003, 2004 and 2006 with players such a such Ken McGrath, Tony Browne, Brian Greene, Eoin Daniels, Eoin Kelly, and Eoin McGrath. Since 2006, Mount Sion have had something of a barren period going without a county final win and, while they reached the final in 2014, Ballygunner came out on top on a score line of 2-16 to 0-9.

Notable players
John Keane
Andy Fleming
Paddy Dowling
Vin Baston
Ian O’Regan
Pat Fanning
Austin Gleeson
Phil Grimes
Seamus Power
Mick Flannelly
Martin Óg Morrissey
 Fred O'Brien
 Frankie Walsh
Larry Guinan
Jimmy Byrne
Pat McGrath
Jim Greene
Ken McGrath
Tony Browne
Eoin McGrath
Brian Greene

Honours
Waterford Senior Hurling Championships: 35
1938, 1939, 1940, 1943, 1945, 1948, 1949, 1951, 1953, 1954, 1955, 1956, 1957, 1958, 1959, 1960, 1961, 1963, 1964, 1965, 1969, 1972, 1974, 1975, 1981, 1983, 1986, 1988, 1994, 1998, 2000, 2002, 2003, 2004, 2006
Waterford Senior Football Championships: 5
1953, 1955, 1956, 1959 and 1961
Waterford Junior Football Championships: 6
1939, 1948, 1990, 2013, 2018, 2021Waterford Junior Hurling Championships: 21934, 2011Waterford Under-21 Hurling Championships: 71973, 1974, 1985, 1991, 1994, 1995 and 1999.
 Waterford Minor Hurling Championships: 271933, 1934, 1945, 1946, 1947, 1948, 1949, 1950, 1952, 1953, 1954, 1955, 1956, 1958, 1962, 1963, 1964, 1965, 1968, 1969, 1991, 1994, 1996, 1998, 1999, 2000 and 2008
 Waterford Minor Football Championships: 5
 1956, 1957 (as Na Risigh), 1958 (as Na Risigh), 1964 (as Na Risigh), 1973  Waterford Minor 'B' Football Championships: 1990, 2008, 2009,
 Munster Senior Club Hurling Championships: 2
1981 and 2002

External links

Gaelic games clubs in County Waterford
Hurling clubs in County Waterford
Gaelic football clubs in County Waterford
Sport in Waterford (city)